The World Figure Skating Championships is an annual figure skating competition sanctioned by the International Skating Union in which figure skaters compete for the title of World Champion.

The competition took place on 13 February in London, United Kingdom.

It was assumed that only men would compete in the event, and just four skaters participated. However, one of them was a woman, Madge Syers-Cave. After the competition, the winner, Ulrich Salchow, delighted with Syers, presented her with the gold medal he had just won. At the time, the International Skating Union rules did not specify that only men are allowed to participate. In the following year, rules were changed and separate championships for females and males were introduced. However, it was several years before the ladies' event first took place in 1906.

The 1902 championships were the first to hold a pairs competition alongside the singles. The title of "world champions" and medals were not awarded, since the only pair to enter were Madge Syers / Edgar Syers of United Kingdom.

Results

Men

Judges:
 W. F. Adams 
 J. H. Thompson 
 Hermann Wendt 
 Dr. Piotr von Weryho 
 Ivar Westergren

References

Sources
 Result List provided by the ISU

World Figure Skating Championships
World Figure Skating Championships, 1902
World Figure Skating Championships
World Figure Skating Championships
International sports competitions in London
International figure skating competitions hosted by the United Kingdom
World Figure Skating Championships